Haliangium ochraceum is a species of moderately halophilic myxobacteria. It produces yellow fruiting bodies, comprising several sessile sporangioles in dense packs. Its type strain is SMP-2 (= JCM 11303(T) = DSM 14365(T)). Its genome has been sequenced.

References

Further reading
Hopwood, David A. Complex enzymes in microbial natural product biosynthesis, Part A: overview articles and peptides: overview articles and peptides. Academic Press, 2009.
Colegate, Steven M., and Russell J. Molyneux, eds. Bioactive natural products: detection, isolation, and structural determination. CRC press, 2007.

External links
LPSN
Type strain of Haliangium ochraceum at BacDive -  the Bacterial Diversity Metadatabase

Myxococcota
Bacteria described in 2002